Arthur Campbell Burt (November 17, 1892April 6, 1950) was a veterinarian and political figure in Ontario. He represented Norfolk in the Legislative Assembly of Ontario from 1931 to 1934 as a Conservative member.

Burt was educated at the Veterinary College in Toronto. In 1916, he married Vira Celia Foster.

Burt was elected to the assembly in a 1931 by-election held following the death of John Strickler Martin. He served as president of the Norfolk County Fair in 1946. Burt died in Simcoe at the age of 58.

References

External links

1892 births
1950 deaths
Progressive Conservative Party of Ontario MPPs